U57 or U-57 may refer to:

 German submarine U-57, one of several German submarines
 Utah State Route 57